Hacavitz is the debut EP by Mexican death metal band Hacavitz. Only 833 copies were available; these include 500 in vinyl and 333 in cassette.

Track listing

Personnel
Antimo Buonnano - guitar, bass, vocals
Eduardo Guevara - guitar
Oscar Garcia - drums

2004 debut EPs
Hacavitz (band) albums
Death metal EPs
Osmose Productions EPs